Norbert Carbonnaux (28 March 1918 – 6 November 1997), was a French film director and screenwriter.

Filmography

Director 
 1951: 90 degrés à l'ombre
 1953: La Tournée des grands ducs
 1954: The Pirates of the Bois de Boulogne
 1956: Short Head
 1958: Le Temps des œufs durs
 1960: Candide ou l'Optimisme au XXe siècle
 1962: The Dance
 1967: All Mad About Him 
 1971: L'Ingénu

Screenwriter 
 1947: Les Atouts de Monsieur Wens by Émile-Georges De Meyst (dialogue)
 1952: Bille de clown by Jean Wall
 1952: Le Costaud des Batignolles by Guy Lacourt

Actor 
 1971: Léa l'hiver by Marc Monnet

References

External links 
 

French film directors

People from Neuilly-sur-Seine
1918 births
1997 deaths